The 2013 Copa Catalunya Femenina was the ninth edition of the competition, running from May 25 to September 1, 2013. RCD Espanyol defeated FC Barcelona on penalties in the final, held in Sant Boi de Llobregat, ending Barcelona's 4-year winning streak.

Preliminary stages

First stage
May 25–26, 2013

1 UE Andreu won 2-3 on penalties.

Second stage
June 1–2, 2013

2 Cerdanyola won 4-5 on penalties.
3 Igualada won 3-5 on penalties.

Third stage
June 8–9, 2013

Final stages

4 Levante Las Planas won 1-4 on penalties.
5 Escola Les Garrigues won on penalties.
6 Espanyol won 3-4 on penalties.

Final

References

2012–13 in Spanish football cups
Cata
Women